Anssi Pesonen (born August 7, 1990) is a Finnish former ice hockey goaltender.

Pesonen made his SM-liiga debut playing with HPK during the 2011–12 SM-liiga season.

References

External links

1990 births
Living people
Finnish ice hockey goaltenders
Hokki players
HPK players
Kokkolan Hermes players
KOOVEE players
Peliitat Heinola players
People from Janakkala
SaPKo players
Sportspeople from Kanta-Häme